Events from the year 1858 in France.

Incumbents
 Monarch – Napoleon III

Events
14 January - Orsini affair: Felice Orsini and his accomplices fail to assassinate Napoleon III in Paris but their Orsini bombs kill 156 bystanders. Orsini is executed on 13 March by guillotine.
11 February - Lourdes apparitions: Peasant girl Bernadette Soubirous of Lourdes, 14, has a vision at the grotto of Massabielle, the first in a series of eighteen events (up to 16 August) which will come to be regarded as Marian apparitions.
August - The first aerial photography is carried out by Nadar, from a tethered balloon.
September - Cochinchina Campaign: French warships, under Charles Rigault de Genouilly, attack and occupy Da Nang, Vietnam.

Arts and literature
21 October - Following the lifting of government licensing restrictions on the number of performers, Jacques Offenbach's first 2-act opéra bouffe, Orpheus in the Underworld (Orphée aux enfers), is premiered at Théâtre des Bouffes-Parisiens.
Camille Saint-Saëns succeeds Louis James Alfred Lefébure-Wély as organist of La Madeleine, Paris.

Births
6 January - Sébastien Faure, anarchist, (died 1942)
9 January - Maurice Couette, physicist (died 1943)
21 January - Mélanie Bonis, composer (died 1937)
31 January - André Antoine, actor-manager (died 1943)
7 February - Amédée-François Lamy, military officer (died 1900)
15 April - Émile Durkheim, sociologist (died 1917)
19 May - Roland Bonaparte, prince, president of the Société de Géographie (died 1924)
28 August - Charles le Bargy, actor and film director (died 1936)
August - Guy d'Hardelot (Helen Rhodes, née Guy), composer, pianist and teacher (died 1936)

Deaths
15 January - Antoine Maurice Apollinaire d'Argout, statesman, minister and governor of the Bank of France (born 1782)
8 February - Ambroise Roux-Alphéran, historian (born 1776)
27 March - Jean Guillaume Audinet-Serville, entomologist (born 1775)
9 April - Auguste François Chomel, pathologist (born 1788)
3 May - Julien Auguste Pélage Brizeux, poet (born 1803)
21 May - Charles-Louis Havas, writer and founder of Agence France-Presse (born 1783)
10 July - Auguste de Montferrand, architect (born 1786)
5 August - Joseph-Marie, comte Portalis, diplomat and statesman (born 1778)
10 December - Joseph Paul Gaimard, naval surgeon and naturalist (born 1793)

References

1850s in France